Gough Glacier is an Antarctic glacier about  long, flowing from the northern slopes of the Prince Olav Mountains and the base of the Lillie Range and trending northward to the Ross Ice Shelf, between the Gabbro Hills and the Bravo Hills. It was named by the Southern Party of the New Zealand Geological Survey Antarctic Expedition (1963–64) for A.L. Gough, surveyor of the party.

Mount Baker stands at the west side of the glacier.

References

Glaciers of Dufek Coast